Sychesia naias is a moth in the family Erebidae. It was described by Karl Jordan in 1916. It is found in Costa Rica.

References

Moths described in 1916
Phaegopterina